Ivan Blomqvist (born 24 June 1986) is a Swedish producer, songwriter and keyboardplayer based in Oslo.

Biography 
Ivan Blomqvist's background in jazz and improvised music has given him the ability to create music in the moment that catches the listener. In recent years he has focused more and more on producing and songwriting, working with some of the most interesting artists on the Scandinavian music scene.
 
He is active in projects such as Mosambique, Neon Ion, Linda Sundblad, Mariama Ndure. In 2017 he was nominated to a Norwegian grammy (spellemann) for ”Newcomer of the year" with the band Rohey.

Discography 

 With Natalie Sandtorv aka Neon Ion
 2020 "Heart Echoes" 

 With Linda Sundblad
 2019 "Det finns ett hav för som vågar" 

 With Mosambique
 2017 "Big City Moves" 

 With Rohey
 2017: A Million Things (Jazzland Recordings)

 With Lukas Zabulionis
 2016: Changing Tides (Curling Legs)

References 

1986 births
Living people
Swedish jazz pianists
21st-century pianists
Jazzland Recordings (1997) artists
Curling Legs artists